Jhumkee features suspense story on Women Violence in Nepal.

Plot 
Jhumkee is 2016  Nepalese  film directed and produced  by Apil Bista in collaboration with Cinema Arts.The film features Manoj RC, Malina Joshi , Rishma Gurung, Dayahang Rai, in lead roles.

Originally set to release on 25 August 2016, Jhumkee team delayed its release date to September 4 due to technical problem in post-production.

Cast

Dayahang Rai
Rishma Gurung . Dewaki
Malina Joshi
Manoj RC
Bholaraj Sapkota
Bijaya Baral
Pramod Agrahari
Rabindra Singh Baniya
Sushmita Karki
Prem Barsha Khadka 
Nischal Basnet Police Officer
Samten Bhutia
Bisharad Basnet

Songs

References

Nepalese drama films